Hum Sab Baraati is an Indian television Hindi language sitcom, which debuted 4 April 2004 on Zee TV. The comedy series was produced by the popular Indian producer Sanjay Chhel, who directed and wrote the script for Hum Sab Baraati. It has won numerous awards, including the award for "Promo for a Sitcom" at the Indian Telly Awards in 2004.

Overview
The theme focuses on a family that specialises in arranging weddings — from selecting the venue to entertaining the guests. Each member of this family specialises in a particular task. To promote the business, they have a website with all the necessary information.

Cast
 Dinyar Contractor as Vrindavan Mehta
 Sulabha Arya as Kanta Ben Mehta
 Bhavana Balsavar as Bhanu
 Tiku Talsania as Chandu Mehta
 Amit Divatia as Maganlal Shah
 Dilip Joshi as Nathu Mehta
 Delnaaz Irani' as Harsha
 Shweta Gautam as Chinmai/Chini Mini
 Munmun Dutta as Mithi Bhouji
 Sharmilee Raj as Ms. Khanna
 Atul Parchure as Durlav
 Rita Bhaduri as Mayalaxmi'
 Raju Kher as Baswani
 Mehul Buch as Laloo

References

External links
 Hum Sab Baraati article on The Hindu, online news magazine
 Sanjay Chhel's interview in Screen weekly magazine

2004 Indian television series debuts
Zee TV original programming
Indian comedy television series